Denis Moschitto (born 22 June 1977) is a German actor best known for his roles in Kebab Connection (2005), Chiko (2008) and In the Fade (2017).

Early life 
Moschitto was born in Cologne, West Germany, to an Italian father and a Turkish mother. In the early 1990s, he was active on the demoscene as a tracker musician under the moniker Merlin M.

Career 
Moschitto made his movie debut in 1999 in Rolf Schübel's Gloomy Sunday.

Moschitto played his first leading role in the comedy  as a Hamburg-based Turk who sets up a phone sex hotline for fellow countrymen. Moschitto then played another leading role in a comedy as a wannabe star movie director in Anno Saul's film Kebab Connection. The drama Chiko, produced by Fatih Akin, features Moschitto as a small-time gangster from Hamburg who wants to get "to the top" by all means.

Besides his work as an actor, Moschitto is the co-author of the computer books Hackerland and Hackertales and a musician with the bands "Scoopex" and "Shining-8".

Personal life 
Moschitto is friends with actors Jessica Schwarz and Daniel Brühl. They shared an apartment in Cologne for a while. He is also a vegetarian since 2003.

Filmography 
 1999: Gloomy Sunday
 2000: 
 2001: 
 2003: 
 2003: 
 2003: 
 2005: 
 2005: Kebab Connection
 2007: Meine böse Freundin
 2008: Chiko
 2008: 1½ Knights: In Search of the Ravishing Princess Herzelinde
 2009: Tatort: Familienaufstellung
 2009: Germany 09
 2011: 
 2011: Almanya – Welcome to Germany
 2013: Closed Circuit
 2014: Coming In
 2017: Wild Mouse
 2017: In the Fade
 2019: Bella Germania
 2020: Dem Horizont so nah

Awards 
In 2003, Moschitto won the Günter-Strack-Fernsehpreis award as the Best Young Actor.
In 2009, he was nominated for the German Film Award as Best Actor for his performance in Chiko

References

External links

1977 births
German people of Turkish descent
German people of Italian descent
German male film actors
Living people
Actors from Cologne
German male television actors